Yorodougou (also spelled Dioradougou) is a town in the far west of Ivory Coast. It is a sub-prefecture of Sipilou Department in Tonkpi Region, Montagnes District.

Yorodougou was a commune until March 2012, when it became one of 1126 communes nationwide that were abolished.

In 2014, the population of the sub-prefecture of Yorodougou was 19,451.

Villages
The seven villages of the sub-prefecture of Yorodougou and their population in 2014 are:
 Gangbapleu (5 248)
 Gbagompleu (738)
 Ouéma (1 389)
 Samapleu (3 995)
 Yépleu (2 503)
 Yorodougou (4 626)
 Zocoma (952)

Notes

Sub-prefectures of Tonkpi
Former communes of Ivory Coast